"Love Kicks..." is an extended play, or EP, by Japanese-American singer Kylee.

Track listing
CD

Music video
The music video for "You Get Me" was filmed on January 8, 2009.

References

External links
  by RX-Records

2009 EPs